= Gonharha =

Gonharha is a village in Uttar Pradesh, India.
